Pyrausta roseivestalis is a moth in the family Crambidae. It was described by Eugene G. Munroe in 1976. It is found in North America, where it has been recorded from California and southern Arizona.

The wingspan is about 17 mm. Adults have been recorded on wing in May, July and from September to October.

Etymology
The species name is derived from Latin rosei (meaning rose) and vestalis (meaning coat).

References

Moths described in 1976
roseivestalis
Moths of North America